The Germanos chain of stores is a multinational chain of retail electronic goods vendors. They specialize in offering electronic devices such as computers, digital cameras, mp3 players and mobile phones. They also offer fixed and mobile telephony as well as internet.

They belong to the Germanos Group which in turn is indirectly owned by the Greek mobile operator Cosmote.

History
The Germanos Group started as a battery shop in Athens in 1980, but then the subsidiary Germanos Stores was created to take charge of the retail points of the company.
Since it has expanded into the Balkans, Central Europe and Eastern Europe. In 2006 the holding company of the Germanos stores was bought by a subsidiary of the Greek mobile operator Cosmote, Cosmoholding Cyprus LTD.

Cosmote controversy
In the beginning Germanos stores offered in Greece mobile connections with Telestet (now WIND Greece) and Cosmote. Later, in 2005 Vodafone Greece gave permission to Germanos to offer its connections. In 2006 when a subsidiary of Cosmote bought the company, Wind and Vodafone pulled their support from the stores, stating that it would lead to unfair treatment towards them in order to enhance support to its in-house mobile operator.

International expansion
Germanos stores expanded throughout the last years in Greece, Cyprus and many Eastern European countries counting as of 2007 960 retail points.

Germanos retail stores are found in:
Greece
Cyprus
North Macedonia
Poland
Romania
Ukraine

Companies based in Athens
Retail companies of Greece
Greek brands
Retail companies established in 1980
1980 establishments in Greece